Lauda-Königshofen is a town in the Main-Tauber district in Baden-Württemberg, Germany. It is situated on the river Tauber, 7 km southeast of Tauberbischofsheim, and 30 km southwest of Würzburg.  Most of the roughly 300 houses in the traditional village of Königshofen date to between the 16th century and mid-19th century, and it is known for the 500+ year-old Königshöfer Messe, an annual festival that attracts 150,000 people over the 10-day festival. Lauda station is at a junction of the Franconia Railway and the Tauber Valley Railway.

Districts
The 12 districts with population (as of 2001): Area in km² (as in 2006)

Twin towns
 Boissy-Saint-Léger (France)
 Paks (Hungary)
 Rátka (Hungary)

Sports
 FV Lauda, soccer
 Lauda Hornets, American football

Notable natives
 
 Johann Gottfried von Aschhausen, (1575–1622), Bishop of diocese Würzburg and Archbishopric of Bamberg
 Johann Rudolf Zumsteeg, (1760–1802), composer
 Johann Martin Schleyer, (1831–1912), developer of artificial language Volapük
 Albert Hehn (1908–1983), actor
 Heinrich Ehrler, (1917–1945), Luftwaffe fighter 
 Karl Weid, (born 1921), the mayor from 1970s onwards 
 Jürgen Hehn, (born 1944), fencer, team world champion with his sword in 1973
 Manuela Ruben, (born 1964), figure skater, Vice European Champion 1984
 Thorsten Weidner, (born 1967), fencer, Olympic team champion with the foil 1992
 Martin Lanig, (born 1986), football player

Notable enterprises
Among the business entities located in Lauda are two world-famous manufacturers of laboratory equipment:
 Lauda, a manufacturer of thermostats.
 Herzog, a manufacturer of crude oil and fuel testing equipment. The founder of the company, Walter Herzog, has moved to Lauda after World War II, and pioneered a few important innovations in the testing of oil and fuels, like first automatic flash point tester, first automatic distillation apparatus, and others.

Events
 Keep It True, annual heavy metal festival
 Königshöfer Messe, annual fair

References

External links
Stefan Heidrich's page about Lauda-Königshofen (German)
Oliver Pinkos's page about the district Beckstein (German)
Ralf Liebenstein's page about the district Messelhausen (German)
Sascha Renk's page about the district Oberlauda (German)

Main-Tauber-Kreis
Baden